Changarian (also Romanized as Changarīān, Changereyān, and Changerīān; also known as Changīzīān and Chingiran) is a village in Gil Dulab Rural District, in the Central District of Rezvanshahr County, Gilan Province, Iran. At the 2006 census, its population was 410, in 108 families.

References 

Populated places in Rezvanshahr County